This article lists various water polo records and statistics in relation to the Germany men's national water polo team, the United Team of Germany men's national water polo team, and the West Germany men's national water polo team at the Summer Olympics.

The Germany men's national water polo team, the United Team of Germany men's national water polo team, and the West Germany men's national water polo team have participated in 17 of 27 official men's water polo tournaments.

Abbreviations

Team statistics

Comprehensive results by tournament
Notes:
 Results of Olympic qualification tournaments are not included. Numbers refer to the final placing of each team at the respective Games.
 At the 1904 Summer Olympics, a water polo tournament was contested, but only American contestants participated. Currently the International Olympic Committee (IOC) and the International Swimming Federation (FINA) consider water polo event as part of unofficial program in 1904.
 Related teams: United Team of Germany men's Olympic water polo team†, East Germany men's Olympic water polo team†, West Germany men's Olympic water polo team†.
 Last updated: 5 May 2021.

Legend

  – Champions
  – Runners-up
  – Third place
  – Fourth place
  – The nation did not participate in the Games
  – Qualified for forthcoming tournament
  – Hosts
 = – More than one team tied for that rank
 Team† – Defunct team

Abbreviation
 EUA – United Team of Germany
 FRG – West Germany
 GDR – East Germany

Number of appearances
Last updated: 5 May 2021.

Legend
 Year* – As host team
 Team† – Defunct team

Best finishes
Last updated: 5 May 2021.

Legend
 Year* – As host team
 Team† – Defunct team

Finishes in the top four
Last updated: 5 May 2021.

Legend
 Year* – As host team
 Team† – Defunct team

Medal table
Last updated: 5 May 2021.

Legend
 Team† – Defunct team

Player statistics

Multiple appearances

The following table is pre-sorted by number of Olympic appearances (in descending order), year of the last Olympic appearance (in ascending order), year of the first Olympic appearance (in ascending order), date of birth (in ascending order), name of the player (in ascending order), respectively.

 Number of five-time Olympians: 0
 Number of four-time Olympians: 2
 Last updated: 5 May 2021.

Abbreviation
 FRG – West Germany
 GER – Germany
 MEX – Mexico

Multiple medalists

The following table is pre-sorted by total number of Olympic medals (in descending order), number of Olympic gold medals (in descending order), number of Olympic silver medals (in descending order), year of receiving the last Olympic medal (in ascending order), year of receiving the first Olympic medal (in ascending order), name of the player (in ascending order), respectively.

Top goalscorers

The following table is pre-sorted by number of total goals (in descending order), year of the last Olympic appearance (in ascending order), year of the first Olympic appearance (in ascending order), name of the player (in ascending order), respectively.

 Number of goalscorers (50+ goals): 0
 Number of goalscorers (40–49 goals): 1
 Number of goalscorers (30–39 goals): 2
 Last updated: 5 May 2021.

Abbreviation
 FRG – West Germany
 GER – Germany
 MEX – Mexico

Sources:
 Official Reports (PDF): 1900, 1928–1936, 1952–1976, 1984–1996;
 Official Results Books (PDF): 2004 (pp. 199–200), 2008 (pp. 196–197).

Goalkeepers

The following table is pre-sorted by edition of the Olympics (in ascending order), cap number or name of the goalkeeper (in ascending order), respectively.

Last updated: 1 April 2021.

Legend and abbreviation
  – Hosts
 Eff % – Save efficiency (Saves / Shots)

Sources:
 Official Reports (PDF): 1996 (pp. 57–61, 67–69);
 Official Results Books (PDF): 2004 (pp. 199–200), 2008 (pp. 196–197).
Notes:
 Alexander Tchigir is also listed in Unified Team men's Olympic water polo team records and statistics.

Top sprinters
The following table is pre-sorted by number of total sprints won (in descending order), year of the last Olympic appearance (in ascending order), year of the first Olympic appearance (in ascending order), name of the sprinter (in ascending order), respectively.

* Number of sprinters (30+ sprints won, since 2000): 0
 Number of sprinters (20–29 sprints won, since 2000): 1
 Number of sprinters (10–19 sprints won, since 2000): 0
 Number of sprinters (5–9 sprints won, since 2000): 1
 Last updated: 15 May 2021.

Abbreviation
 Eff % – Efficiency (Sprints won / Sprints contested)

Source:
 Official Results Books (PDF): 2004 (pp. 199–200), 2008 (pp. 196–197).

Olympic champions

1928 Summer Olympics

See also
 List of men's Olympic water polo tournament records and statistics
 Lists of Olympic water polo records and statistics
 Germany at the Summer Olympics
 United Team of Germany at the Olympics
 West Germany at the Olympics

References

Sources

ISHOF

External links
 Germany men's national water polo team – Official website
 Olympic water polo – Official website

.Olympics, Men
Olympic water polo team records and statistics